The 1959 VPI Gobblers football team represented the Virginia Polytechnic Institute in the 1959 NCAA University Division football season.

Schedule

Players
The following players were members of the 1959 football team according to the roster published in the 1960 edition of The Bugle, the Virginia Tech yearbook.

References

VPI
Virginia Tech Hokies football seasons
VPI Gobblers football